Events in the year 1812 in Art.

Events
The last of the Elgin Marbles are removed from the Parthenon in Athens and shipped to the UK.
Hokusai publishes his first  (art manual), Quick Lessons in Simplified Drawing.

Awards
Prix de Rome (for sculpture) – François Rude

Works

Alexander Carse – The Arrival of the Country Relations
Jacques-Louis David – The Emperor Napoleon in His Study at the Tuileries
Hortense de Beauharnais – The Knight's Departure (approximate date)
Marie-Philippe Coupin de la Couperie – The Tragic Love of Francesca da Rimini
Caspar David Friedrich
The Garden Terrace
The Tombs of the Old Heroes
Théodore Géricault – The Charging Chasseur
Francisco Goya
Portrait of the Duke of Wellington (originally painted)
Equestrian Portrait of the Duke of Wellington
The Burial of the Sardine (possible date)
Guillaume Guillon-Lethière – The Judgement of Paris
Jean-Auguste-Dominique Ingres
Portrait of the Countess of Tournon
Virgil Reading the Aeneid to Augustus, Livia and Octavia
John Martin – Sadak in Search of the Waters of Oblivion
Henry Raeburn – Colonel Alasdair Macdonell of Glengarry
Pierre Révoil – The Tournament (Le tournoi)
J. M. W. Turner – Snow Storm: Hannibal and his Army Crossing the Alps

Births
March 1 – Augustus Pugin, English architect, illustrator, and designer (died 1852)
April 15 – Théodore Rousseau, French landscape painter (died 1867)
May 12 – Edward Lear, English painter, illustrator and humorous writer (died 1888)
June 30 – Josabeth Sjöberg, Swedish painter and music teacher (died 1882)
July 9 – Thomas Musgrave Joy, English portrait painter (died 1866)

Deaths
 February 20 – Felix Ivo Leicher, Czech-born Viennese painter of altarpieces and secular works (born 1727)
 March 2 – John Raphael Smith, English painter and engraver (born 1751)
 March 11 – Philip James de Loutherbourg, naturalized English theatrical scene painter (born 1740)
 March 14 – Robert Cromek, English engraver and art dealer (born 1770)
 March 18  – Johann Ziegler, Austrian painter of landscapes and city scenes (born 1749)
 March 29 – Johann Friedrich Dryander, German-born portrait painter (born 1756)
 June 16 – Franz Pforr, German Nazarene movement painter (born 1788)
 June 21 – Johann Friedrich August Tischbein (Leipziger Tischbein), painter (born 1750)
 August 2 – Edward Smyth, Irish sculptor (born 1749)
 August 23 – Tethart Philipp Christian Haag, German-born Dutch portrait artist (born 1737)
 October 21 – Heneage Finch, 4th Earl of Aylesford, British peer, politician and artist (born 1751)
 December 24 – George Beck, American painter and poet (born 1749)
 Undated 
 William Burgess, English painter and art teacher (date of birth unknown)
 Robert Cromek, English  engraver, editor, art dealer and entrepreneur (born 1770)
 John Eyre, Australian painter and engraver (born 1771)
 Antoine Michel Filhol, French engraver (born 1759)
 Thomas Gaugain, English stipple engraver (born 1756)
 Francis Jukes, English etcher, engraver and publisher (born 1745)
 Michelangelo Maestri, Italian painter (date of birth unknown)
 James Nixon, English miniature-painter (born 1741)
 Giulio Traballesi, Italian designer and engraver (born 1727)
 Kazimierz Wojniakowski, Polish painter (born 1771)

 
Years of the 19th century in art
1810s in art